LeRoy Township is a civil township of Osceola County in the U.S. state of Michigan. The population was 1,159 at the 2000 census. The Village of LeRoy is located within the township.

Communities
Dewing's was a community centered on a sawmill in this township.  It had a post office from 1900 until 1907.

Geography

Demographics
As of the census of 2000, there were 1,159 people, 418 households, and 316 families residing in the township. There were 537 housing units at an average density of 15.4 per square mile (5.9/km2). The racial makeup of the township was 97.67% White, 0.17% African American, 0.60% Native American, 0.26% Asian, 0.09% Pacific Islander, and 1.21% from two or more races. Hispanic or Latino of any race were 1.12% of the population.

There were 418 households, out of which 39.0% had children under the age of 18 living with them, 62.4% were married couples living together, 9.3% had a female householder with no husband present, and 24.2% were non-families. 20.8% of all households were made up of individuals, and 9.3% had someone living alone who was 65 years of age or older.  The average household size was 2.77 and the average family size was 3.19.

In the township the population was spread out, with 30.5% under the age of 18, 7.1% from 18 to 24, 29.2% from 25 to 44, 22.3% from 45 to 64, and 11.0% who were 65 years of age or older.  The median age was 35 years. For every 100 females, there were 94.5 males.  For every 100 females age 18 and over, there were 93.3 males.

The median income for a household in the township was $35,625, and the median income for a family was $42,404. Males had a median income of $27,625 versus $23,804 for females. The per capita income for the township was $15,333.  About 8.9% of families and 10.6% of the population were below the poverty line, including 14.1% of those under age 18 and 17.1% of those age 65 or over.

References

Townships in Osceola County, Michigan
Townships in Michigan